Daniel Pieter "Reniel" Hugo (born 19 July 1990) is a South African professional rugby union player for Sharks (Currie Cup) in the Currie Cup in South Africa. He mainly plays as a lock, but can also play as a loose forward and flanker.

Career

Western Province / Maties

Hugo's first provincial selection came in 2008, when he was included in the  side that played at the Under-18 Craven Week competition (the premier high school rugby union competition in South Africa) which was held in Pretoria. He was also included in a South Africa Schools Elite squad named after the tournament.

After finishing high school, Hugo joined the Western Province Academy and represented the s during the 2009 Under-19 Provincial Championship.

In 2010, Hugo was named in the  squad for the 2010 Varsity Cup competition, but failed to make any appearances in the competition. He was a first-choice lock for  during the 2010 Under-21 Provincial Championship, starting thirteen matches and scoring two tries as his side won the title, beating  43–32 in the final held in Durban, with Hugo playing the entire 80 minutes of the final.

Hugo had his first taste of Varsity Cup action in 2011, starting two of ' matches during the competition.

Blue Bulls / UP Tuks

Hugo made the move to Pretoria to join defending Varsity Cup champions  for the 2014 Varsity Cup season.

After his side's elimination from the Varsity Cup, he was included in the ' squad for the 2014 Vodacom Cup.

Hugo started all eight of ' matches during the 2015 Varsity Cup, scoring three tries.

Hugo's personal contributions didn't go unnoticed, however, and he was named in a Varsity Cup Dream Team at the conclusion of the tournament. He was also appointed as captain of the side which played one match against the South Africa Under-20s in Stellenbosch.

Free State Cheetahs

Personal

References

1990 births
Living people
Blue Bulls players
Cheetahs (rugby union) players
Free State Cheetahs players
Rugby union flankers
Rugby union locks
Rugby union number eights
Rugby union players from Bellville, South Africa
Sharks (Currie Cup) players
Sharks (rugby union) players
South African rugby union players
Toyota Verblitz players
Western Province (rugby union) players